Darwinia leptantha is a flowering plant in the family Myrtaceae. It is an upright, small shrub with white flowers turning pink with age, triangular-shaped leaves and is endemic to New South Wales.

Description
Flowering occurs from late autumn to spring.

Taxonomy and naming
Darwinia leptantha was first formally described in 1962 by Barbara Gillian Briggs and the description was published in Contributions from the New South Wales National Herbarium. The specific epithet (leptantha) means "slender flowered".

Distribution and habitat
This darwinia grows in coastal heath and sandy soils on the coast and ranges from Laurieton to the Clyde River of eastern New South Wales.

References

leptantha
Flora of New South Wales
Plants described in 1962
Taxa named by Barbara G. Briggs